Steve Gonzalez (born December 2, 1980) is an American retired soccer player who last played for Los Angeles Blues in the USL Professional Division.  He was born in Downey, CA.

References

1980 births
Living people
American soccer players
San Diego Flash players
LA Galaxy players
Orange County SC players
Soccer players from California
USL Championship players
Association football goalkeepers